Baldyzh is a rural locality (a village) in Bryansky District, Bryansk Oblast, Russia. The population was 28 as of 2013. There is 1 street.

Geography 
Baldyzh is located 3 km south of Glinishchevo (the district's administrative centre) by road. Glinishchevo is the nearest rural locality.

References 

Rural localities in Bryansky District